The 1905 Grand National was the 67th renewal of the Grand National horse race that took place at Aintree Racecourse near Liverpool, England, on 31 March 1905.

It was won by Kirkland, a 6/1 shot that had been trained in Wales. He was the first Welsh-trained horse to have won the Grand National, and was ridden by Frank Mason.

Finishing Order

Non-finishers

References

 1905
Grand National
Grand National
20th century in Lancashire
March 1905 sports events